William T. Tukuafu (born January 3, 1984) is an American football coach and former fullback for the Seattle Seahawks. He was signed by the Seattle Seahawks as an undrafted free agent originally in 2010. He has also played for the San Francisco 49ers.

Tukuafu was born in Salt Lake City, Utah. He graduated from East High School, attended Scottsdale Community College in Scottsdale, Arizona, then transferred to the University of Oregon.

College career

Tukuafu played in 39 games (37 starts) for the Ducks, registering 131 tackles, 32.5 tackles-for-loss, 14.5 sacks, four forced fumbles, five fumble recoveries, and four passes defensed. As a senior, he was named Second-team All-Pac-10 by the coaches. He also earned Oregon's Schaffeld Award and the Gonyea Award.

Professional career

Seattle Seahawks
Tukuafu was signed as an undrafted free agent on June 8, 2010 and was released on June 22, 2010.

San Francisco 49ers
Tukuafu was signed by the 49ers on August 12, 2010. He was released on September 3, 2010 and was re-signed to the practice squad two days later. He was promoted to the 49ers' active roster on December 18, 2010. He made NFL debut and recorded his first career fumble recovery on his first career play from scrimmage vs. Seattle on September 11, 2011. During his tenure in San Francisco, he saw action in 20 games from 2010-2013 and additionally six career playoff appearances with two starts. His versatility has allowed him to play fullback, defensive line, and on special teams.

At the end of the 2012 season, Tukuafu and the 49ers appeared in Super Bowl XLVII. He appeared in the game on offense, defense, and special teams, but the 49ers fell to the Baltimore Ravens by a score of 34–31.

Seattle Seahawks (second stint)
Tukuafu was signed by the Seahawks on October 29, 2014. He was released on September 3, 2016 and re-signed again on September 13 only to be released again the following week. On October 26, 2016, he was re-signed by the Seahawks. He was placed on injured reserve on December 13, 2016 after suffering a concussion in Week 13.

References

External links
 San Francisco 49ers bio

1984 births
American football defensive ends
American football defensive tackles
American football fullbacks
American people of Tongan descent
Living people
Oregon Ducks football players
San Francisco 49ers players
Seattle Seahawks players
Scottsdale Community College alumni
Players of American football from Salt Lake City
Seattle Seahawks coaches